X Factor is a Bulgarian television music competition to find new singing talent and part of a British franchise The X Factor. The fifth and final season began on 10 September 2017 and concluded on 17 December 2017. The judging panel consisted of Kristian Talev (Krisko), Sanya Armutlieva, Lubo Kirov and Velizar Sokolov (Zaki). Aleksandra Raeva and Maria Ignatova returned as presenters of the main show on NOVA. The winner of competition received 50 000 leva and a contract with a record company.

Selection process

Auditions
The minimum age to audition for this season was 14. Contestants needed three or more 'yeses' from the four judges to progress to Bootcamp.

Judges' houses

Finalists
Key:
 – Winner
 – Runner-up
 - Third place

Live shows
The live shows began on 22 October 2017, with the performance shows taking place every Sunday along with the results show on the same day. The live shows will be filmed at Global Group Studio in Sofia and will conclude on 17 December 2017. The thirteen finalists were revealed on 15 October 2017 immediately after the last judges' houses episode.

Musical guests
Krisko with Pavell & Venci Venc' performed on the third live show, while DARA performed on the fourth live show. Nevena Peykova performed on the fifth live show, while Mihaela Fileva and Slavin Slavchev along with Julian's Laughter will perform on the sixth live show. Mihaela Marinova performed on the seventh live show, while TITA will perform on the eighth live show.

Results summary

Colour key

Notes
1 Lyubo Kirov was not required to vote as there was already a majority.

Live show details

Week 1 (22 October)
Theme: "Express yourself" (songs to showcase who they are)

This week's results show featured a double elimination. The three acts with the fewest votes were announced as the bottom three and the act with the fewest public votes was then automatically eliminated. The remaining two acts then performed in the final showdown for the judges' votes.

Week 2 (29 October)
Theme: "Halloween Night"

Week 3 (5 November)
Theme: "Bulgarian Hits"
Musical guests: Krisko feat. Pavell & Venci Venc' ("Герой")

Week 4 (12 November)
Theme: "Love Songs"
Musical guests: Darina Yotova ("Недей")

Week 5 (19 November)
Theme: "Movie Night"
Musical guests: Nevena Peykova ("Трябваш ми спешно")

Week 6 (26 November)
Theme: "Party Night"
Musical guests: 
Mihaela Fileva ("Последни думи")
Slavin Slavchev and Julian's Laughter

Week 7 (3 December)
Theme: "Evergreen Songs and Duets"
Musical guests: Mihaela Marinova ("Листата падат"), ("Един срещу друг")

Week 8: Semi-final (10 December)
Theme: Bulgaria vs. The Rest of the World
Musical guests: TITA ("Антилопа")

This week's results show featured a double elimination. The three acts with the fewest votes were announced as the bottom three and will perform in the final showdown then the public decide who they want to save.

Week 9: Final (17 December)
Musical guests: Christiana Louizu, Kristian Kostov, Margarita Hranova, Mihaela Marinova

References

Bulgarian television series
Season 5
2017 in Bulgarian television